Michael J. Williams (born October 9, 1966) is a former professional American football wide receiver in the National Football League (NFL). He played six seasons for the Detroit Lions (1989) and the Miami Dolphins (1991–1995). Williams played college football at Northeastern University and was selected in the tenth round of the 1989 NFL Draft by the Los Angeles Rams.

References

1966 births
Living people
People from Mount Kisco, New York
Players of American football from New York (state)
American football wide receivers
Northeastern Huskies football players
Detroit Lions players
Miami Dolphins players
John Jay High School (Cross River, New York) alumni